Mae Mo railway station is a railway station located in Sop Pat Subdistrict, Mae Mo District, Lampang. It is located 609.168 km from Bangkok railway station and is a class 2 railway station. It is on the Northern Line of the State Railway of Thailand. A freight line once operated to the nearby coalmines but was ceased operations in 1989. The station opened in April 1916 following the opening of the Northern Line Mae Chang-Nakhon Lampang section.

Train services
 Express 51/52 Bangkok-Chiang Mai-Bangkok
 Rapid 102 Chiang Mai-Bangkok
 Rapid 109 Bangkok-Chiang Mai
 Local 407/408 Nakhon Sawan-Chiang Mai-Nakhon Sawan

References 
 Ichirō, Kakizaki (2010). Ōkoku no tetsuro: tai tetsudō no rekishi. Kyōto: Kyōtodaigakugakujutsushuppankai. 
 Otohiro, Watanabe (2013). Tai kokutetsu yonsenkiro no tabi: shasō fūkei kanzen kiroku. Tōkyō: Bungeisha. 

Railway stations in Thailand